Radio Skid Row (callsign 2RSR) is a community radio station based in Marrickville, broadcasting to the Inner West suburbs of Sydney.  This includes the former municipalities of Leichhardt and Marrickville, and the existing City of Sydney. Its broadcast signal can be received across much of Sydney, and its audience extends to many communities in Greater Western Sydney and, through online streaming, across the world.

Radio Skid Row has built a reputation for development and training projects with minority communities and has been pivotal in allowing disadvantaged communities to participate in community broadcasting. It was home to the original Radio Redfern and later Koori Radio which now has its own citywide licence. It was also the station where Muslim radio started in Sydney.

History
Radio Skid Row began as a landline operation available in Community Youth Support Scheme Centres, Long Bay Gaol and local drop-in centres. The station secured a community radio licence in 1983 to broadcast to the inner-city areas of Sydney.

Initially the plans for the station was that it would play commercial music and would broadcast relevant information that homeless people needed, such as accommodation availability and where to obtain free meals.

Tensions emerged during the first year of operations at the station, sparked by a management style that limited volunteer involvement in the structures and operation of the station, thereby going against the principles of community broadcasting.

In June 1984 the management tried to close the station down and lock out the volunteers and community program makers. The station was off the air for three weeks and when it reopened was only on air for twelve hours a day. Station workers then took the opportunity to overturn the board of directors at an Annual General Meeting, which happened shortly after the lockout. The station then set about reforming itself based on a cooperative model, in a style similar to that of 4ZZZ.

Current Activity
The station's mission is to provide a voice for youth, community groups and in languages other than English. It is particularly active in working with marginalised members of the community.

In 2019 the station held its first supporter drive with an online fundraising campaign, surpassing its initial target of $36,000 AUD.

Programming
Radio Skid Row plays a mix of music, with a focus on reggae, African, indigenous, hip hop, RnB, music from the Pacific Islands and from around the world. There are programs catering to local and international hip hop/RnB, afrobeat and reggae, and many programs providing music, news and talk content for Sydney's diverse migrant communities, such as the Nepalese, Greek, Macedonian, Latin American, Urdu, Hindi, Ghanaian, Sierra Leone, Melanesian, Fijian, Tongan, Cook Islands, and Maori shows. It also specialises in talk programs presented from a radical viewpoint and covering local and national issues. Radio Skid Row is also the only station in Australia to broadcast the award-winning US current affairs show, Democracy Now!, daily at 9am.

See also
 List of radio stations in Australia

References

External links

1983 establishments in Australia
Radio stations in Sydney
Community radio stations in Australia
Radio Skid Row